Castillonroy or Castellonroi is a municipality located in the province of Huesca, Aragon, Spain. According to the 2007 census (INE), the municipality has a population of 382 inhabitants.

It has two official names: Castillonroy and Castellonroi.

References

Municipalities in the Province of Huesca